Men's Premiership Trophy: Joel Fox Shield (1924–present)

Women's Premiership Trophy: Fearon Cup (1962–present)

* Unofficial competition – Victorian Lacrosse Association not formed until 1879

Premierships by Club

* defunct club

† The current Caulfield Lacrosse Club was formed in 1909. A previous Caulfield Lacrosse Club won three VLA premiership in 1892, 1893 and 1894

See also

Lacrosse in Australia

References

Victoria
Victoria
Lacrosse
Lacrosse